The Lola T96/50 is an open-wheel formula race car chassis developed by British manufacturer Lola, for use in the International Formula 3000 series, a feeder-series for Formula One, between 1996 to 1998 (1999 for Italian F3000), until it was replaced by the new Lola B99/50 chassis for the new in 1998. Similar chassis', dubbed the Lola T96/51 and Lola T96/52, were used in the Japanese Formula Nippon series until 1999, and were powered by  Mugen V8 engines.

Specifications 
Engine displacement: Cosworth DFY/Zytek-Judd KV F3000  DOHC V8
Power output:  @ 9,000 rpm
Torque ouput:  @ 6,900 rpm
Compression ratio: 13.6:1
Bore: 
Stroke: 
Engine weight: 
Gearbox: 5-speed sequential manual gearbox + reverse
Weight:  (including driver)
Fuel: 102 RON unleaded
Fuel delivery: Zytek Electronic-indirect fuel injection
Aspiration: Naturally-aspirated
Front Track Width: 
Rear Track Width: 
Wheelbase: 
Length: 
Steering: Non-assisted rack and pinion

References 

Open wheel racing cars
International Formula 3000
Lola racing cars